Brian Myles Brady (29 March 1903 – 10 September 1949) was an Irish Fianna Fáil politician. Born Bernard Myles Brady to Myles Brady, merchant, and Sarah Murrin of Killybegs. He represented Donegal and Donegal West in Dáil Éireann as a member of Fianna Fáil from 1932 until his death in 1949. Following his death, a by-election was held on 16 November 1949, the seat was won by the Fine Gael candidate Patrick O'Donnell.

References

1903 births
1949 deaths
Fianna Fáil TDs
Members of the 7th Dáil
Members of the 8th Dáil
Members of the 9th Dáil
Members of the 10th Dáil
Members of the 11th Dáil
Members of the 12th Dáil
Members of the 13th Dáil
Politicians from County Donegal